Everything Will Be Fine is a German comedy film written by Angelina Maccarone and Fatima El-Tayeb, released in 1998. Everything Will Be Fine was the first German film since Toxi with a Black German female protagonist. Additionally, it was the first German comedy with a non-white protagonist. The film aired on German TV and brought novelty to German film through its use of comedy to highlight racism. Maccarone drew from screwball comedy of the 1930s and took it back, made it witty, and “queered” it. Additionally, Everything Will Be Fine moved away from a “problem film”, one that accentuates strangeness, to a film that highlights black female protagonists who are self-sufficient and free. The black characters were not depicted as strangers or problems for the German nation through Maccarone's ability to show the “everydayness” of black Germans. This is in stark contrast to Toxi, a 1952 German film, that highlights Toxi, a young black German girl, as a problem.

Cast 
Kati Luzie Stüdemann as Nabou
 as Kim
 as Giuseppa
Pierre Sanoussi-Bliss as Kofi
Aglaia Szyszkowitz as Katja
 as Dieter

Reception 
The film won the 1998 Best Feature Film Award at the Paris Lesbian and Feminist Film Festival.

References

External links

1998 films
German romantic comedy films
German LGBT-related films
1998 LGBT-related films
LGBT-related romantic comedy films
Lesbian-related films
1990s German films